William John Francis "Bill" Jenner (born 1940) is an English sinologist and translator, specialising in Chinese history and culture, and translator of Chinese literature.

Biography 
From 1958 to 1962, Jenner studied sinology at Oxford and wrote his dissertation about the history of Luoyang in the fifth and sixth century, especially through the work of Yang Xuanzhi. His first wife was the China scholar Delia Davin.

From 1963 to 1965, he worked as a translator at Foreign Languages Press in Beijing. There he translated From Emperor to Citizen, an "autobiography" of the last Emperor of China, Puyi, and started translating the novel Journey to the West into English.

Since 1965, Jenner has taught at the University of Leeds, Australian National University and the University of East Anglia.

From 1979 to 1985, Jenner travelled to China every summer, and worked on the translation of  Journey to the West and other works, for example by Lu Xun. He has written about the process and politics of translating and publishing Journey to the West in an essay published in the Los Angeles Review of Books (3 Feb 2016).

His most recent project is The History of China in two volumes.

Jenner has two daughters, one son and seven grandchildren.

Partial bibliography

Translations

Monographies

Articles

References

1940 births
Living people
Academics of the University of East Anglia
British sinologists
English historians
English translators
Literary translators